The 1941 Villanova Wildcats football team was an American football team that represented Villanova University as an independent during the 1941 college football season. In its sixth season under head coach Maurice J. "Clipper" Smith, the team compiled a 4–4 record and outscored opponents by a total of 84 to 58. The team played its home games at Villanova Stadium in Villanova, Pennsylvania.

Center Ed Korisky was selected by the Associated Press as a first-team player on the 1941 All-Eastern football team.

Schedule

References

Villanova
Villanova Wildcats football seasons
Villanova Wildcats football